Paravinciguerria is an extinct genus of prehistoric bony and ray-finned fish that lived during the lower Cenomanian, an age within the Cretaceous period. It is one of the first known genera in the order Stomiiformes.

See also

 Prehistoric fish
 List of prehistoric bony fish

References

Late Cretaceous fish